Markus Villig is an Estonian billionaire entrepreneur and founder and CEO of global mobility company Bolt Technology OÜ.

After finishing high school in Tallinn in spring 2013, Markus began working on the first iteration of Bolt after receiving a €5,000 loan from his family. This allowed him to build the first prototype of the app while he recruited drivers personally on the streets of Tallinn. 

In September 2013 he enrolled at the University of Tartu to read Computer Science, however left at the end of his first semester to work on the company full-time.

Today Bolt has grown into a global mobility company with over 100 million customers across 45 countries and five products — ride-hailing, micromobility rental, food and grocery delivery (via the Bolt Food app), and car-sharing. 

In January 2022 Bolt was valued at $8.4 billion after raising $709 million in new funding led by Sequoia Capital and Fidelity Investments.  The valuation made Markus the youngest self-made billionaire in Europe.

Markus has received numerous accolades in recognition of his achievements as an entrepreneur. In 2016 he was featured as the youngest CEO in the Forbes 30 under 30 list in the Baltics and also received the presidential award for the Best Young Entrepreneur in Estonia. In 2018 he was named EY’s Estonian Entrepreneur of the Year at the World Entrepreneur of the Year Business Forum and Estonian national newspaper Aripaev also named him Entrepreneur of the Year in 2022.

In November 2022, Markus was made a Partner of the Ministry of Foreign Affairs in Estonia, which recognises individuals who support the country’s foreign policy interests, for his contribution in supporting Ukraine following its invasion by Russia. 

Markus is an active early-stage angel investor and has invested in companies including Yaga, a platform for buying and selling second-hand fashion goods, and KOOS, a stakeholder incentivisation platform. He continues to live and work in Tallinn.

References 

Living people
Estonian business executives
Estonian billionaires
1993 births
Businesspeople in transport
University of Tartu alumni